Laura Lee Perkins (July 20, 1939 – April 6, 2018) was a rockabilly musician. Though not commercially successful, Perkins gained popularity during the European rockabilly revival of the 1970-1990s. She was a member of the Rockabilly Hall of Fame.

Early life 
Laura Lee Perkins was born Alice Faye Perkins in Killarney, West Virginia to Chester and Hazel Perkins. Alice Faye learned to play guitar and piano in her youth. She attended Stoco High School where she also learned to play the trumpet.

Career 
Perkins moved to Ohio in 1957 where she met a local disc jockey who sent her demos to his contacts at Imperial Records. Perkins flew to California in February 1958 and recorded with Ricky Nelson's band during sessions at Imperial. The songs produced during these sessions include Don't Wait Up and Kiss Me Baby. The label changed her stage name to Laura Lee Perkins and referred to her as the “female Jerry Lee Lewis” while promoting her 1958 record.

Perkins returned to Ohio and later moved to Detroit in 1959. She continued to perform and tour will several bands. Her early records were never commercially successful, but became highly collectable during the European rockabilly revival. She released the album I’m Back and Here We Go: Laura Lee Perkins, Rockabilly Legend in 2006.

Perkins was a member of the Rockabilly Hall of Fame.

Personal life 
Perkins married Neal Kitts in 1963. The couple had three sons.

Discography

Singles

Album 
 2006: I’m Back and Here We Go!

References 

American rockabilly musicians
1939 births
2018 deaths
Women rock singers